Kalestan, also rendered as Kialston and Kyalston, may refer to:
 Kalestan-e Olya
 Kalestan-e Sofla